Endrit is an Albanian name for boys, meaning “light”. Notable people with the name include:

Endrit Shala (born 1981), Kosovo politician
Endrit Vrapi (born 1982), Albanian football player
Endrit Karameto (born 1995), Albanian football player
Endrit Ferizoli, performer on the Trollstation YouTube channel

Albanian masculine given names